Miyota was a former name of Citizen Finedevice Co., Ltd. and is a brand of mechanical and quartz watch movements manufactured by Citizen Watch Manufacturing Co., Ltd. (CWMJ), a subsidiary of Citizen Watch Co., Ltd.

In 1959 Miyota Precision Co., Ltd. was established in the town of Miyota, Nagano Prefecture, Japan as an assembly factory for wristwatches. The company renamed Miyota Co., Ltd. in 1991  and Citizen Miyota Co., Ltd. in 2005 and was merged with Citizen Finetech Co., Ltd. to form Citizen Finetech Miyota Co., Ltd. in 2008 and merged with Citizen Seimitsu Co., Ltd. to form Citizen Finedevice Co., Ltd. in 2015. The company produces watch parts such as crystal oscillators and bearing jewels, but its watch movement manufacturing business has been transferred to Citizen Watch Manufacturing Co., Ltd.

In 2016 a large movement assembly factory (CWMJ Miyota Saku Factory) in Saku, Nagano Prefecture was opened. Most watch brands do not make their own movements in-house, but rather use standard watch movements manufactured by specialized companies like Miyota.

Products

Mechanical movements
Miyota produces various 'standard' and 'premium' grade mechanical movements for automatic wristwatches.

The Miyota 8215 is an entry level non-hacking twenty-one jewel three-hand with date automatic wristwatch movement with a uni-directional winding system (left rotation) with an accuracy of -20 to +40 seconds per day, and a power reserve of over 40 hours. It allows hand winding. The date window may be placed at the 3 o'clock position (cal. 8215-33A) or at 6 o'clock (cal. 8215-36A). The diameter of the movement is 26 mm and the thickness is 5.67 mm. It beats at 21,600 BPH or 3 Hz (6 half-cycles per second). The movement has a 49° lift angle.

The Miyota 9015 is a more sophisticated hacking twenty-four jewel three-hand with date automatic wristwatch movement with a uni-directional winding system (left rotation). The 9015 automatic movement has a beat rate of 28,800 BPH (= 4 Hz), 51° lift angle, 24 jewels and features (automatic) winding, a ≥42 hours power reserve, manual winding and a hack function (stopping the movement of the second hand). The static accuracy rating is −10 to +30 seconds per day (23±2 °C).

Electric movements
Miyota also produces various electric driven movements for quartz watches. These are categorized in standard, slim, small, multi-function, chronograph, and small second chronograph movements.These movements are used by a variety of watch brands such as Bulova, MVMT and Skagen.

Usage
Miyota movements are used by many watch makers besides Citizen for some of their watches, among them Invicta, Boldr, Bulova, Bernhardt, Casio, Corgeut, Timex.

Gallery

References

Company website
Miyota movements at calibercorner.com

Watch movement manufacturers
Citizen Watch